Full Metal Panic! is a series of light novels written by Shoji Gatoh and illustrated by Shiki Douji running from 1998 to 2011. The series follows Sousuke Sagara, a member of the covert anti-terrorist private military organization known as Mithril, who is tasked with protecting Kaname Chidori a hot-headed Japanese high school girl.

Sousuke Sagara 

 is the main protagonist of the series. Sousuke Sagara is of Afghan-Japanese heritage. While his Japanese heritage can be deduced by his surname, Sagara grew up in Helmand, a region in Afghanistan caught up in political strife. At the age of 8, he joined a guerrilla movement to survive and was eventually recruited by Mithril. Sousuke only knows military life and as a result, does not handle the everyday occurrences of civilian life very well. He has difficulty integrating into high school  due to his lack of social skills. His military bearing and encyclopedic knowledge of weapons earn him the nickname "Military Maniac". He often responds to situations as though he were on the battlefield; for example, he blows up the shoe lockers if there is any hint that someone has tampered with them. Sousuke can be quite insensitive at times: In Volume 7 he buys a pregnancy test while out with Kaname and does not understand what was wrong, though his intentions are always in the right place. He gradually develops strong feelings for Chidori Kaname. He is a Muslim.

Kaname Chidori 

 is the heroine of the series. She is described in the universe as "the kind of girl everyone looks up to, but not even a boy wants as their girlfriend". She is direct and brash with her opinions, a trait she picked up when she studied abroad in the United States. She feels the need to protect Sousuke from the harsh, cruel world of high school: a place where he doesn't quite fit. She is one of the "Whispered," a group of people who have technologically advanced knowledge in their subconscious that numerous governments and other groups want to use for their means.

She often berates Sousuke for his violent overreactions, stating that they are not proper for a high school student. While she criticizes Sousuke for being too militaristic and overprotective, she appreciates his experience in life-or-death situations. Chidori develops serious feelings for Sousuke and feels dejected when he is so obtuse in such matters.

Teresa "Tessa" Testarossa 

 is the captain of Mithril's submarine Tuatha de Danaan. She's very young for her position, only 16 years old, and has a crush on Sousuke. Tessa maintains an optimistic outlook that she can make a difference in the world. She is stubborn and will try her hardest to prove wrong to those who tell her she can't do something. Still, most of her crew sees her as someone who never got her hands dirty on the battlefield and therefore can't defend herself.

Kurz Weber 

 appears to be a typical ladies' man and often offers Sousuke advice about life and love. He is laid-back, but will not avoid responsibilities. He is regarded as one of the finest snipers in Mithril.

Melissa Mao 

 is the superior officer of both Sousuke and Kurz. She is a spunky woman who loves beer, smokes a lot, and wishes she could be free-spirited and optimistic like Tessa. She was originally a member of the Marines, signing her recruitment contract on the day she was supposed to marry a businessman that her father had pushed onto her. Eventually, she left the Marines and joined Mithril, where she met Kurz and Sousuke as new recruits. The two were downplaying their skills intentionally, but she saw through their ruse and picked them out to be her teammates.

Gauron 

 is Full Metal Panic's main antagonist, a twisted and violent mercenary deeply involved in the black market and global terrorism. Despite possessing an extremely vile personality, his ruthless cunning and mastery of the Lambda Drive system make him a force to be reckoned with on the battlefield. In combat, his vehicle of choice is the super AS called Venom.

Mithril

Andrei Sergeivich Kalinin

Andrei Sergeivich Kalinin is Sagara's commanding officer and one of Tessa's military strategists with the rank of lieutenant commander, fulfilling the role of Operations Director. He is also the foster father of Sagara. He and Sousuke were once enemies, as mentioned in a two-part episode by Sagara himself. The foster father status may be on the school's official papers only, but Kalinin is certainly a very fatherly figure to Sagara. Kalinin was formerly of the Soviet special forces – Spetsnaz – and was the leader of the team that found a crashed Japanese airliner. There was only one survivor: a three-year-old child by the name of Sagara Sousuke. His wife is deceased  and the whereabouts and status of the rest of his family are unknown. There is speculation that Kalinin has betrayed Mithril to Amalgam, due to his meeting with Leonard Testarossa at the end of the book 'Dancing Very Merry Christmas' and also due to his mysterious disappearance and attitude during the raid by Amalgam on Mérida Island. Kalinin later appears in 'Tsudou Make My Day' at Leonard's villa, apparently as one of Leonard's subordinates. He later shoots Leonard in the chest before Leonard could detonate the TARTAROS system along with Mérida Island. In a final knife battle with Sousuke, he is mortally wounded by Sousuke just before the nuclear missile hits the island.

Kalinin mentioned that he had difficulty maintaining family ties, mostly with his wife, due to his time spent with the Spetsnaz. He seems to be of a family man sort and loves his wife so much that he made the Borscht (that Sousuke avoids at all costs) that his wife made him as he returns from missions. He operates under the codename Perth 1.

Richard Mardukas

Richard Mardukas is an overly protective aide of Tessa, who insists on guarding her with his life. He holds the rank of commander and is in charge of Mithril's TDD-1 when the captain, Testarossa, is not on board; appropriate, given that Mardukas' position is that of executive officer. Mardukas is often seen wearing a hat bearing the name of HMS Turbulent, a real British submarine.

Before joining Mithril, Mardukas was the commanding officer of HMS Turbulent, and a graduate & instructor of the Royal Navy's "Perisher" course: the submarine equivalent to the US Navy's famed "Top Gun" Fighter Weapons School. According to the FMP novel A Dancing Very Merry Christmas, Mardukas was known to the submarine community as a genius of submarine warfare, leading to his nickname "Duke"; he also served on HMS Conqueror when it sank the General Belgrano, and while commanding the Turbulent saved Tessa's father and his submarine on a secret mission. Many of his peers in the submarine community, such as Commander Killy B. Sailor, CO of the USS Pasadena, believe Mardukas to be working in a shipping firm after his retirement. A running gag throughout the series is that he usually ends up giving sermons to lower officers on deck.

Belfangan Clouseau (Ben)

SRT team's current team leader, callsign Urzu-1, first appearance in the novel 'End of Day by Days' and the 2nd anime series Full Metal Panic: The Second Raid, replacing Captain Gail McAllen after his death near the end of the novel 'Rocking into The Blue' (and subsequently, the 1st anime series). The pilot of the M9D Falke was a part of MITHRIL's Mediterranean Sea Fleet. His first introduction to the team was kind of unorthodox, ticking off Kurz Weber and Sousuke Sagara by saying McAllen was a coward after sitting on the chair he used to sit on while in reality, McAllen was one of his most trusted teammates and a good friend. He proved himself to be an expert martial artist by incapacitating Kurz with just one move  and defeated Sousuke and the Arbalest during the 'test' which he conducted. He also proved to be a capable leader when he made Sousuke understand why he lost and told him that it wasn't his skill as they were evenly matched in that aspect but rather his hatred for the Arbalest  and tells him that an Arm Slave is like a part of their own body. Since then Kurz and he does not regularly see eye-to-eye, though they have developed a grudging respect for each other's abilities. It is also known that he & Melissa Mao have known each other since way back. His nickname from Mao was 'Ben'. He was also one of the few remaining survivors of the attack on Melida island, along with Melissa Mao, Kurz Weber, Richard Mardukas, Teletha Testarossa, and most of the crew of the Tuatha de Danaan at the end of the novel 'Continuing on My Own'.

In the TSR OVA, it is revealed that he is an anime otaku in his spare time.

His surname is also Grouseaux. In the Ending of Day by Days novel, Belfangan states to the bartender in Mérida Island that he was a Muslim.

Vincent Bruno

An American  MITHRIL officer in Intelligence with the rank of captain, he was supposedly responsible for communications maintenance in the Nanjing hostage rescue operation. He, however, leaked it to Gates and several Amalgam commandos, using the information to ambush SRT/PRT members, killing some of them. In return, Admiral Borda allowed a snatch operation to take place, which resulted in his capture and some strains in the relationship between the Tactical and Intelligence divisions. During his interrogation in Sydney, Vincent confesses that Amalgam had hired him to botch the Nanjing operation. He previously operated under the codename Ogma-1.

His surname can also be spelt as Blueno. Vincent speaks Italian aside from English.

Gavin Hunter

A supposed native of Hong Kong and an officer in MITHRIL Intelligence's Hong Kong division, he was responsible for providing tactical support for Melissa, Sousuke, and other SRT/PRT personnel deployed in Hong Kong to locate a rogue Amalgam Codarl Arm Slave that went berserk in Hong Kong and Kowloon. Gavin is also married and has a family.

He's known to the Hong Kong public as a businessman with multiple businesses in operation, such as the Hunter Cleaning Company Ltd. that Gavin used when he provided Melissa's squad with Hunter Cleaning Company Ltd. Toyota Hiace vans and uniforms to infiltrate Hong Kong and Kowloon without being caught by the North and South Chinese army and police.

He can be considered to be MITHRIL's humor character as Gates is to Amalgam's since he always smiles and rarely gets angry, except when he was instructed by General Amit to cease Intelligence operations in Hong Kong territory.

Nora Lemming

An engineer based in Mérida Island with the rank of second lieutenant, Nora has worked on the Lambda Driver, particularly on its potential continuous application after MITHRIL realizes that Amalgam's Arm Slaves can continuously use their own Lambda Driver.

Previously, Nora had conducted some studies on the Chodarl Arm Slave when it was captured from Gauron. She is a graduate of MIT and was responsible for the Arbalest after Bunny Morauta died.

It is hinted at in the novels that she is in an intimate relationship with Lieutenant Commander Kalinin.

Jerome Borda

The leader of Mithril's Operations department with the rank of admiral. He was the one to order Sousuke to give up his position as a high school student at Jindai High in The Second Raid and the book 'The End by Day by Day'. He is presumed dead after an explosion rocked through Operations Headquarters in Sydney following the beginning of Amalgam's attack on Mithril, however, it was eventually revealed he survived and is intending to rebuild Mithril. Borda is intended to be an homage to the late Admiral Jeremy Michael Boorda, the 25th Chief of Naval Operations of the US Navy. His surname can also be spelt as Boda or Voda.

Tessa calls him "Uncle Jerry" in the Second Raid, hinting at Borda's familiarity with Tessa and her family as Borda was superior to Tessa's late father.

Roy Seals
A retired NAVSPECWAR officer, Seals was one of the founding members of Mithril. His role in the organization is unknown, but he was one of the few members of Mithril's inner circle to survive the assassination. He acquires an M6A3 Dark Bushnell, a USSOCOM M6, for Sousuke to use in his assault on Leonard's lair. Sousuke describes Seals as "...like Kurz, fifty years old, and more perverted."

Mayer Amit

The leader of Mithril's Intelligence department with the rank of general and of Israeli descent. He was the one to order Wraith to discreetly observe and passively protect Kaname Chidori.

Before joining MITHRIL, Mayer was supposedly a top agent for Mossad.

Kim Yunhi/Wraith
Voiced by: Sayaka Ohara (Japanese, real voice); Christopher Ayres (voice changer), Elizabeth Maxwell (real voice) (English)

A North Korean ex-spy, who is also a master of disguise. As a member of the Intelligence Department, she was ordered to watch Kaname and protect her from serious threats. Although appearing cold at first, following her 'rescue' by Kaname from Leonard Testarossa, she opens up slightly and secretly meets with Kaname. She also saved Sousuke and Kyoko's lives from Amalgam members on the Jindai High School rooftop and aided in the defusing of the bomb planted on Kyoko. She even went as far as to perform emergency surgery on Kyoko after a piece of shrapnel embedded itself inside her diaphragm and then took her to the hospital. Showing further compassion, she also allowed Kaname Chidori to give herself up to Leonard so Sousuke's life would be spared, despite violating her orders. After the events in "Continue On My Own", she is still helping Mithril, helping Gavin Hunter to complete the construction of ARX-8 Laevatein at the end of the novel 'Burning One Man Force', and has helped to transport the completed Laevatein to Sousuke in the progress of "Get Together and Make My Day". Though serious about her duties, she seems to enjoy making Sousuke react by putting him on edge, like pointing a laser sight at Kagurazaka-sensei as "revenge" for having to watch over Kaname during the winter while Sousuke gets to stay indoors.

Lord Mallory

The current head of MITHRIL's General Council. He is also responsible for overseeing MITHRIL's day-to-day operations. During the Second Raid series, he was the one who gave the order to MITHRIL officers to devise anti-infiltration countermeasures when he learned of Vincent Bruno's defection after the Nanking disaster.

Based on his mannerisms, his clothing (monocle on right eye), and his title, it is safe to assume that Lord  Mallory is of British descent.

Amalgam

Leonard Testarossa

A child prodigy and Whispered like his younger twin sister, Teletha, he is known as "Mr Silver" in the executive circle of the Amalgam organization. He also claims to be in love with Kaname Chidori and has earned her contempt by stealing her first kiss. In The Second Raid he is chaperoned by two miniature ASs. It is speculated  that his special Whispered knowledge has allowed the creation of the Codarl and Codarl-m (Mithril codename "Venom") type AS types (as Bunny Murata was to the Arbalest), the miniature Alastor types, and the Leviathan-type underwater fighter/AS hybrids. In the novel, Continuing On My Own, he is seen piloting the near-invincible Belial type AS and shows the strength of the machine and himself as a pilot by completely obliterating the Arbalest (Sousuke managed to survive with minor injuries), and taking away Kaname. In Always, Stand By Me part II, Kalinin kills him before he can detonate the TARTAROS system along with Mérida Island.

Admiral Borda is familiar with him, aside from Tessa and their parents. However, Admiral Borda doesn't know about Leonard's ties to Amalgam.

Xia Yu Lan

A Chinese-born assassin, raised by Gauron alongside her twin sister Xia Yu Fan. She and her elder sister, Xia Yu Fan, were ordered by Gauron to finish off Kaname Chidori to mentally break down Sousuke since Gauron knew that he was attached to her ever since Sousuke was assigned to be Kaname's bodyguard. Later in Japan, she was killed by Leonard's man-size Arm Slave bodyguard named Alastor by strangling her to death, her corpse being used by Gates to mock Xia Yu Fan. She wears a vest with red linings on it.

Early on, Yu Lan raises her disgust with Gates, the earliest in Balic when Gates shoves the barrel of his CZ-75 pistol into her mouth when Yu Lan mocked his sympathy for a dead Amalgam commando when he shot him in the head without a second thought.

In combat, she used dual machetes. Aside from this, she is an expert in using throwing knives and is fairly proficient in the use of small arms. She is sixteen years old.

Xia Yu Fan

Another Chinese-born assassin was raised by Gauron and the "eldest" of the Xia siblings. She and Xia Yu Lan were given the last orders by Gauron to finish off Kaname after being crippled by Sousuke's Arbalest. Yu Fan is a proficient Arm Slave pilot, using a Zy-98 Shadow Arm Slave before using a stolen Chodarl in central Hong Kong. However, she is also good at using small arms and is an expert in unarmed combat. She wears a trench coat with green linings on it.

In the last episode, Yu Fan reveals that the Xia siblings were at odds with Amalgam, mostly for wiping out their town in China during the Second Chinese Civil War. She is sixteen years old.

Gates

An original character for the television animation 'Full Metal Panic! The Second Raid'. He takes over the character Mr K from the light novels.

An Amalgam agent and the head of Amalgam's Execution Squads, Gates seems to have two personalities. He is known to kill his subordinates whenever he messes up an operation, hears that an Amalgam-sponsored mission is a failure, and (for the most part) when he is angry. Gates kills through a variety of methods including shooting an Amalgam commando in the head when he backtalked and crushing Xia Yu Fan's Shadow Arms Slave with extreme ferocity. He is also shown to be highly abusive of his subordinates with him kicking his second-in-command off a helicopter and nearly drowning him in a pool.

Despite such brutality, Gates showed his intelligence by being able to deduce accurately the tactics that MITHRIL's Special Response Team utilized in their intervention in the Balic civil war. At one point, Gates began to sing Ave Maria while Xia Yu Lan and a group of Amalgam commandos began to kill every armed Balic soldier. One light side about Gates is that he is protective of himself, especially about being bald since the front of his head shows no hair present. Gates is killed by Sousuke when he uses the Arbalest's Lambda Driver in full power to defeat his Codarl Arm Slave. Gates is shown to be accepting of his fate by playing with a strand of his hair saying, "Maybe I cut it too long?" while his machine was facing mass destruction.

It can be assumed that Gates was known as "Mr Kalium" throughout Amalgam, as in the light novel, A Dancing Very Merry Christmas. It is said that Gauron (otherwise known as Mr Iron) was responsible for the death of Mr Kalium (Gauron does put into motion a series of events that end with Gates's death, though Gauron's only intention seems to have been to lure Sousuke to himself).

It is shown that he is also a sexual deviant. He proves this by saying how even though Xia Yu Lan and Xia Yu Fan were underage he did not hold back from "satisfying" them as well as himself leading him to being an ephebophile. He also calls them Lolita-Kun (lolita is an unofficial term for a child in pornography) when taunting them for escaping. When he manages to acquire the body of one of the girls it makes references to the idea that he will dabble in a spot of necrophilia with either or both of the girl's bodies. In the same scene where he finds out that the girls have escaped, it depicts him being interrupted in the process of masturbating over the image of kittens on his wide-screen TV. A truly twisted individual, when concluding his communication with Xia Yu Lan and Xia Yu via his television he returns to his previous channel which is now depicting squirrels. It would seem that on top of pedophilia he has a penchant for bestiality, at least so far with small "cute" mammals. Gates can speak some Mandarin aside from English.

Steven Harris

A Caucasian man with a beard and captain of the ship, Pacific Chrysalis. However, he and some of the ship's personnel are secret agents of Amalgam.

Mr. Gold

Very little is known about this mysterious character yet, but it is assumed he is the leader of Amalgam. He activated Captain Steven Harris as an agent of Amalgam aboard the ship the Pacific Chrysalis. He also gave Harris the order to deploy the Alastors aboard the ship.

Civilians (Jindai High)

Kyoko Tokiwa

 is Kaname's best friend, a humble and polite girl who wears glasses and has her hair tied in two pigtails. She tries to bring Kaname and Sousuke together, however impossible it may seem given Sagara's tendency to blow things up at whim. In the novel Continuing On My Own, she is held hostage by Amalgam's agents as bait to lure Sousuke so they could kill him and find Kaname. During the rescue attempt, Kyoko is seriously injured, but is saved by Wraith, and is later seen recovering in the hospital.

Shinji Kazama

 is Sousuke's Arm Slave-loving classmate. He shares the same amount of passion for AS as Sousuke and could be considered Sousuke's best school friend besides Kaname. His father is Shintaro Kazama and a secretary of Narashino's Assault Machine Troop. Shinji's love for AS began when his dad failed to become an AS pilot. As a result of his father's failure, Shinji strives to discover the result of the failure and to fulfil his father's dream of becoming a pilot. There is no indication as to what happened to his mother, but it's assumed that Shintaro is a widower before the series started.

Mizuki Inaba

 is a classmate of Chidori who initially blames her for having stolen her boyfriend. She becomes one of her closer friends later on in the series. Mizuki is easily infatuated with various men, who usually take an interest in Kaname instead.

Eri Kagurazaka

 is an English teacher at Jindai High and is the class advisor to Sousuke, Kaname, Kyoko, Shinji, and Mizuki in Class II-4. She is a kind and understanding teacher, who is willing to put the interest of her students over her own, as shown when she confronted Gauron and some North Korean secret agents over taking Kaname from her seat in the hijacked Boeing 747 at Sunan Air Base. However, she's known to get a mean temper whenever she finds Sousuke to be responsible for disastrous things in the school (which she always is a victim of).

Atsunobu Hayashimizu

 is the president of Jindai High's Student Council and a third-year student. He is highly intelligent and seems to be able to deal with any situation – no matter how difficult. His behaviour is always calm, and he is never seen as angry. He often considers Sousuke's behaviour a reasonable response to the kind of situations he finds himself in, much to his frustration of Kaname. He assigns Sousuke to be the head of security in the Student Council, and Sousuke and Atsunobu share a mutual respect. On many occasions involving the school, Sousuke tends to treat Atsunobu just as he would a senior officer in the military, even to the point of calling him "Excellency" in the English dub. Atsunobu is also known for holding a white fan, on which various Japanese characters are written. In addition, he is seen reading famous books – Niccolò Machiavelli's The Prince among them. As with the Japanese characters on his white fan, the books often change even within the same scene – a reference to his high intelligence and calm attitude that provides a comic aspect to the character. Atsunobu is voiced by Toshiyuki Morikawa in the original Japanese anime, and by Christopher Ayres in the English dub.

Ren Mikihara

 is the Secretary of Jindai High's Student Council, a friend of Kaname's, and the daughter of a Yakuza boss. She is an example of Yamato Nadeshiko – the Japanese ideal of femininity – and as such, she is beautiful, dependable, and caring. She seems to have feelings for Atsunobu Hayashimizu, the Student Council's president. However, much about her is still unknown. Because women in the time of the Tokugawa shogunate were given names with two syllables only (usually adding the prefix "O-" to refer to someone of higher social standing and considered an honorific), Kaname prefers to address her as Oren-san. She is voiced by Rie Tanaka in the original Japanese anime, by Nancy Novotny in the English version by ADV Films, and by Julie Shields in the English dub of Invisible Victory by Funimation.

Issei Tsubaki
 is the black belt leader of Jindai High's Karate Club. However, he is extremely nearsighted and can see only when wearing his glasses, which leads to several comic incidents. His sense of pride cannot accept the fact that he was defeated by Sousuke and is constantly challenging him to rematch, which Sousuke usually avoids. He has a huge crush on Kaname and in the short story, Irrelevant Emotion accidentally indicates Sousuke when confessing his love for her. In the Full Metal Panic? Fumoffu anime, Mizuki falls in love with him in the last episode. In Irrelevant Emotion, however, she falls for him after he saves her from falling out of a window. He is voiced by Jun Fukuyama in the original Japanese anime, and by Nomed Kaerf in the English version by ADV Films.

Minor characters

Mira Kudan

 is a whispered girl that Sousuke rescues right in the very beginning. When Mithril is destroyed, she goes into hiding along with Wraith and Hunter in Alaska. With the help of AL, the original AI system in the Arbalest, she builds the ARX-8 Laevatein. In the novel translation, she is called Sarah Miller. She is voiced by Shiho Kikuchi in Japanese, and Kira Vincent-Davis in English.

Seina

Seina joined the terrorist organization A21 a long time ago when it was a refuge for delinquents. Now that the world has turned against her, she uses anyone close to her to aid her in revenge – mass destruction. She is voiced by Mayumi Asano in Japanese, and Kelli Cousins in English.

Takuma Kugayama

Takuma is the unstable experiment of the terrorist organization, A21. All he wants out of life is to please who he thinks is his big sister, Seina, (since he killed his actual one) but she's been scarred and vowed revenge against society long ago. Now, the only thing that seems to please her is Takuma piloting the mech, Behemoth, and wreaking as much havoc as possible. He is voiced by Susumu Chiba in Japanese, and Spike Spencer in English.

Zaied

When Sousuke joined a guerrilla movement at age 8, he was befriended by Zaied, who was only 3 years older. Zaied became his mentor and taught him the art of combat and survival. He was later believed by Sousuke to have been killed by a raid made by Gauron on the guerilla village. Eight years later, it is revealed that he had instead teamed up with Gauron to deliver a nuclear warhead, and Sousuke meets him again during his mission to assassinate Gauron. He is voiced by Takehito Koyasu in Japanese, and Illich Guardiola in English.

Commander Killy B. Sailor

The commanding officer of the US Navy attack submarine USS Pasadena, Sailor crosses paths with Mithril twice: first, during Gauron's hijack of Tuatha de Danaan, he launches torpedoes at TDD-1 in retaliation for Gauron's missile strike on the USS Bunker Hill. Secondly, during the events of the novel Dancing Very Merry Christmas, Sailor is a passenger aboard the Pacific Chrysalis when Amalgam activates Harris and a force of Alastors. What little is known about him is that he was an enlisted chief petty officer who served with Tessa's father, who encouraged him to enter OCS. He holds Mardukas in high regard, having met him in the incident where Turbulent saved them. His Codename is "McClane".

References

Full Metal Panic!
Full Metal Panic!